Ardmore Airport  is a privately owned airport, located two nautical miles (4 km) southwest of the central business district of Ardmore, a city in Limestone County, Alabama, United States. The airport is currently unlicensed by the State of Alabama.

Facilities and aircraft 
Ardmore Airport covers an area of 46 acres (19 ha) at an elevation of 922 feet (281 m) above mean sea level. It has one runway designated 1/19 with a turf surface measuring 2,700 by 100 feet (823 x 30 m).

For the 12-month period ending July 8, 2010, the airport had 2,260 aircraft operations, an average of 188 per month: 90% general aviation, 9% military, and 1% air taxi. At that time there were 8 aircraft based at this airport: 75% single-engine and 25% multi-engine.

References

External links 
 Aerial image as of 6 March 1997 from USGS The National Map

Airports in Alabama
Transportation buildings and structures in Limestone County, Alabama